Zitek is a surname. Notable people with the surname include:

 Ellen Zitek, character from the BBC medical drama Casualty
 Josef Zítek (1832–1909), Czech architect 
 Václav Zítek (1932–2011), Czech opera singer 

Czech-language surnames